is a railway station in Kita, Tokyo, Japan, operated by the East Japan Railway Company (JR East).

Lines
Akabane Station is served by the following lines.

  Tōhoku Main Line (Utsunomiya Line)
  Takasaki Line
  Keihin-Tōhoku Line
  Shōnan-Shinjuku Line
  Saikyō Line

Station layout
The station consists of four elevated island platforms serving eight tracks. The tracks of the Tōhoku Shinkansen also cross this station, above the Saikyō Line platforms.

The station has a "Midori no Madoguchi" staffed ticket office and a "View Plaza" travel agency.

Platforms

History
Akabane Station opened on 1 March 1885.

Passenger statistics
In fiscal 2013, the station was used by an average of 89,742 passengers daily (boarding passengers only), making it the 47th-busiest station operated by JR East. The passenger figures for previous years (boarding passengers only) are as shown below.

Surrounding area

 Akabane-iwabuchi Station (Tokyo Metro Namboku Line)
 Arakawa River
 Sumida River
 Nishigaoka Soccer Stadium

References

External links

 Akabane Station information (JR East) 

Tōhoku Main Line
Utsunomiya Line
Takasaki Line
Shōnan-Shinjuku Line
Keihin-Tōhoku Line
Saikyō Line
Akabane Line
Stations of East Japan Railway Company
Railway stations in Tokyo
Railway stations in Japan opened in 1885